Polyglotta Africana is a study published in 1854 by the German missionary Sigismund Wilhelm Koelle (1823–1902), in which the author compares 280 words from 200 African languages and dialects (or about 120 separate languages according to today's classification; several varieties considered distinct by Koelle were later shown to belong to the same language). As a comparative study it was a major breakthrough at the time.

Koelle based his material on first-hand observations, mostly with freed slaves in Freetown, Sierra Leone. He transcribed the data using a uniform phonetic script. His data were consistent enough, however, to enable groupings of languages based on vocabulary resemblances. Notably, the groups which he set up correspond in a number of cases to modern groups: 
North-West Atlantic — Atlantic
North-Western High Sudan/Mandenga — Mande
North-Eastern High Sudan — Gur

Although Koelle's was not the first such study comparing different African languages, (for example, a missionary called John Clarke had produced a similar work in 1848, and still earlier Hannah Kilham had produced her Specimens of African Languages, Spoken in the Colony of Sierra Leone in 1828), yet in its accuracy and thoroughness it outclassed all the others and still proves useful today.

Value of the work
The Polyglotta Africana was the second work carried out by Koelle during his five years in Sierra Leone, the first being a grammar of the Vai language in 1849. The idea of this was to use the fact that Sierra Leone was a melting pot of ex-slaves from all over Africa to compile a list of 280 basic words (a sort of early Swadesh list) in some 160 languages and dialects. These were then grouped as far as possible in families. Most of the informants who contributed to this work came from West Africa, but there were also others from as far away as Mozambique. One area that was lacking was the Swahili coast of Kenya and Tanzania, since it seems that slaves from this region were generally taken northwards to Zanzibar and Arabia rather than southward towards America and Brazil. The pronunciations of all the words were carefully noted using an alphabet similar, though not identical, to that devised by Karl Richard Lepsius, which was not yet available at that time. The name of the book was imitated from a well-known work called Asia Polyglotta (1823) by the German scholar Julius Klaproth.  

The value of the list is not merely linguistic, since the work not only includes the words themselves, but Koelle also added a short biography of each informant, with geographical information about their place of origin, and an indication of how many other people they knew in Sierra Leone who spoke the same language. This information, combined with a census of Sierra Leone conducted in 1848, has proved invaluable to historians researching the African slave trade in the 19th century. Of the 210 informants, there were 179 ex-slaves (two of them women), while the rest were mostly traders or sailors. An analysis of the data shows that typically Koelle's informants were middle-aged or elderly men who had been living in Freetown for ten years or more. Three-quarters of the ex-slaves had left their homeland more than ten years earlier, and half of them more than 20 years before; and three-quarters of the informants were over 40 years old. Another interesting facet of the book is the manner in which the informants had been made slaves. Some had been captured in war, some kidnapped, some sold by a relative, others condemned for a debt or sentenced for a crime.

Included with a book is a map of Africa showing the approximate location, as far as it could be ascertained, of each language, prepared by the cartographer August Heinrich Petermann.

The transcription
It was Koelle's aim not to use any previously published material on the languages he was writing down, but to achieve uniformity by having one person using a single phonetic system for every language. The orthography he eventually chose, after discussions in London, was not that of Karl Richard Lepsius (as is sometimes claimed), since it had not yet been published, but was based on a short document issued in 1848 by Henry Venn of the Church Missionary Society entitled Rules for Reducing Unwritten Languages to Alphabetical Writing in Roman Characters With Reference Specially to the Languages Spoken in Africa. The aim of this was to produce a simple practical system of orthography for teaching purposes with the use of as few diacritics as possible. Koelle, however, sought a more accurate phonetic system, and added diacritics. He retained seven of the eight vowels of Venn's system (i, e, ẹ, a, ọ, o, u, omitting ạ as in "but") but added length marks, a dot for nasalisation, and an accent to indicate the prominent syllable. (Unlike in Lepsius's alphabet, the dotted ẹ and ọ are open not closed sounds.) He modified Venn's alphabet by writing dṣ for the sound of "judge" or "church" (apparently confusing these two), and n followed by a dot (n˙) for the "ng" sound of "sing". When Koelle learnt of Lepsius's alphabet in 1854, he made immediate use of it in his Kanuri grammar, in which he wrote:

"I much regret that this System was not propounded sooner, so that I might also have adopted it in my Vei-Grammar and Polyglotta Africana. Happily, however, the Orthography which I employed in those books already so nearly approaches the System of Prof. Lepsius, as to only require some minor alterations."

Koelle's word list
In the introduction Koelle tells us that he wanted a selection of words that would be simple enough for each informant to be interviewed on a single day, and for this reason he omitted pronouns, which would have taken much longer to elicit. He adds that a few years earlier during a long vacation he had made a similar such list, of just 71 languages, and that in making the present list he had learnt from that experience.

The actual list (the spelling is Koelle's) is as follows:

 One
 Two
 Three
 Four 
 Five
 Six
 Seven
 Eight
 Nine
 Ten
 Eleven
 Twelve
 Thirteen
 Fourteen
 Fifteen
 Sixteen
 Seventeen
 Eighteen
 Nineteen
 Twenty
 Man
 Woman
 Boy
 Girl
 Father
 Mother
 Grandfather
 Grandmother
 Son
 Daughter
 Elder Brother
 Younger Brother
 Elder Sister
 Younger Sister
 Friend
 Stranger
 King
 Male Slave
 Female Slave
 Doctor
 Medicine
 Head
 Hair
 Face
 Forehead
 Nose
 Eye
 Ear
 Mouth
 Tooth
 Tongue
 Throat
 Gullet
 Neck
 Shoulder
 Arm
 Arm between Shoulder and Elbow
 Arm between Elbow and Wrist
 Leg
 Outer Hand, or Hand
 Inner Hand
 Foot, or Instep of the Foot
 Foot-sole
 Finger
 Toe
 Elbow
 Rib
 Chest
 Female breast
 Belly
 Navel
 Thigh
 Knee
 Heel
 Nail (of Finger and Toe)
 Skin
 Bone
 Vein
 Blood
 Itch
 Small-pox
 Hat
 Cap
 Shoe
 Shirt
 Trousers
 Waist-cloth
 Town (Village)
 Market
 House
 Door
 Doorway
 Bed
 Mat
 Knife
 Spoon
 Ear-ring
 Armlet or Bracelet
 Pot
 Calabash
 Gun
 Powder
 Sword
 Spear
 Bow
 Arrow
 Quiver
 War
 God
 Devil
 Idol
 Greegree
 Sacrifice
 Heaven (sky)
 Hell
 Fire
 Water
 Soup
 Meat (often Animal)
 Salt
 Gold
 Iron
 Stone
 Hoe
 Axe
 Book
 Ink
 Sun
 Moon (? full)
 New Moon
 Day
 Night
 Dry Season
 Rainy Season
 Rain
 Dew
 Coal
 Smoke
 Soap
 Sand
 Canoe
 Bench, Chair
 Needle
 Thread
 Rope
 Chain (Fetters?)
 Drum
 Tree
 Firewood
 Walking-stick
 Leaf
 Root
 Palm-tree
 Palm-Oil
 Guinea-Corn (bearing like Maize)
 Kuskus (bearing like Oats)
 Cotton
 Cotton-plant (a Shrub)
 Cotton-tree
 Camwood
 Rice (uncooked)
 Yam
 Cassada
 Ground-nut
 Pepper
 Onion
 Maize
 Beans
 Farm
 Forest
 Horse
 Mare
 Cow
 Bull
 Milk
 Butter
 Ewe (Sheep)
 Ram (Sheep)
 Goat
 Buck
 Cat
 Rat
 Pig
 Bat
 Pigeon
 Parrot
 Fowl (Hen)
 Cock
 Egg
 Bird
 Fish
 Serpent
 Scorpion
 Mosquito
 Butterfly
 Spider
 Wasp
 Bee
 Honey
 Lion
 Leopard
 Elephant
 Ivory
 Alligator
 Monkey
 Chamelion
 Lizard (the common one)
 The large red-headed Lizard
 Toad
 Frog
 Dog
 Great, large
 Little, small
 White
 Black
 White Man
 Black Man (Negro)
 Good
 Bad
 Old
 New (young)
 Sick
 Well
 Hot
 Cold
 Wet
 Dry
 Greedy
 Stupid
 Rich
 Poor
 Straight
 Crooked (bent)
 I go
 I come
 I run
 I stop
 I sit down
 I lie down
 I breathe
 I cough
 I sneeze
 I snore
 I laugh
 I weep
 I kneel
 I dream
 I sleep
 I die
 I fall
 I rise
 I speak
 I hear
 I beg
 I bathe (wash myself)
 I see
 I take
 I buy
 I sell
 I love thee
 I give thee
 I eat rice (yam)
 I drink water
 I cook meat
 I kill a fowl
 I cut a tree
 I flog a child
 I catch a fish
 I break a stick
 I call a slave
 I cover a pot
 I sew a shirt (cloth)
 I pray to God (beg God)
 I play
 I do not play
 I dance
 I do not dance
 Yesterday
 Today
 To-morrow

The languages

As the list of languages and countries below shows, most of Koelle's languages came from West Africa. This is mainly because the majority of the slaves themselves who were intercepted by the British Navy and taken to Sierra Leone were from that region. Another factor was that the number of different languages in West Africa is greater than in some other parts of Africa. For example, Cameroon alone is said to have 255 different languages. One area missing is the Swahili coast of Kenya and Tanzania, apparently because slaves intercepted there were taken not to Sierra Leone but to Zanzibar.

Koelle's language names are given in the left-hand column of the table below: some of the diacritics (such as the dot beneath ẹ and ọ, and the acute accent) have been omitted. The groupings are Koelle's own.  The larger groups are subdivided by Koelle into smaller groups, which are not shown in the table. 

Names in square brackets such as [Aku] are subheadings of a group of languages, and do not themselves have any words. The number of languages or dialects represented on each double-page spread of Koelle's book is therefore exactly 200, divided into four columns of 50 languages each.

Bibliography
 Arnott, D. W. (1965). "Fula Dialects in the Polyglotta Africana". Sierra Leone Language Review, 4, 1965, pp. 109–121.
 Blench, Roger (draft). The Bantoid Languages.
 Blench, Roger; Hamm, Cameron (draft). "The Nun Languages of the Grassfields of Cameroun".
 Clarke, John (1848/9). Specimens Of Dialects, Short Vocabularies Of Languages: And Notes Of Countries And Customs In Africa.
 Curtin, Philip D. (1969). The Atlantic Slave Trade: A Census. University of Wisconsin.
 Curtin, Philip D.; Vansina, Jan (1964). "Sources of the Nineteenth Century Atlantic Slave Trade" The Journal of African History, Vol. 5, No. 2 (1964), pp. 185–208.
 Dalby, D. (1964). "Provisional identification of languages in the Polyglotta Africana", Sierra Leone Language Review (1964), 3, pp. 83–90.
 Dalby, David (1965). "Mel Languages in the Polyglotta Africana (Part I)". Sierra Leone Language Review 4, 1965, pp. 129–135.
 Dalby, David (1966). "Mel Languages in the Polyglotta Africana (Part II)". Sierra Leone Language Review 5, 1966, pp. 139–.
 Doneux, J. L. (1969). "Studies devoted to S. W. Koelle's Polyglotta Africana: Le Gio". African Languages Review, vol. 8, 1969, pp. 263–271.
 Green, Margaret M. (1967). "Igbo Dialects in the Polyglotta Africana". African Language Review 6, pp. 111–119.
 Greenberg, Joseph (1966). "Polyglotta Evidence for Consonant Mutation in the Mandyak Languages." Sierra Leone Language Review 5, 1966, pp. 116–110.
 Guthrie, Malcolm (1964). "Bantu Languages in the Polyglotta Africana". Sierra Leone Language Review 3, pp. 59-64.
 Hair, P. E. H. (1963). "Koelle at Freetown: An Historical Introduction”, in Koelle, (1963 [1854a]), Polyglotta Africana, ed. P. E. H. Hair. Graz, pp. 7–17.
 Hair, P. E. H. (1965). "The Enslavement of Koelle's Informants". The Journal of African History, Vol. 6, No. 2 (1965), pp. 193–203.
 Hair, P. E. H. (1966a). "Collections of Vocabularies of Western Africa before the Polyglotta: A Key". Journal of African Languages, 1966, pp. 208–17.
 Hair, P. E. H. (1966b). "An Introduction to John Clarke's "Specimens of Dialects" 1848/9.". Sierra Leone Language Review, 5, 1966, pp. 72–82.
 Hedinger, Robert (1984), A Comparative-Historical Study of the Manenguba languages (Bantu A.15, Mbo Cluster) of Cameroon. University of London PhD thesis.
 Houis, Maurice (1966). "Review: (Untitled). Reviewed Work: Polyglotta Africana by Sigismund Wilhelm Koelle." L'Homme. T. 6, No. 1 (Jan. - Mar., 1966), pp. 136–139. (in French)
 Innes, Gordon (1967). "Mende 1n the Polyglotta Africana". African Language Review 6, pp. 120–127.
 Koelle, S.W. (1854.) Polyglotta Africana, or a comparative vocabulary of nearly three hundred words and phrases, in more than one hundred distinct African languages. 188 pp. London, Church Missionary House. 
 Köhler, Oswin (1964). "Gur Languages in the Polyglotta Africana". Sierra Leone Language Review 3, 1964, pp. 65–73.
 Kropp, Mary Esther (1966). "The Adampe and Anfue Dialects of Ewe in the Polyglotta Africana." Sierra Leone Language Review 5, 1966, pp. 116–121.
 Lacroix, P. F. (1967). "Le Vocabulaire «Kandin» dans la Polyglotta Africana". African Language Review 6, pp. 153–158.
 Laver, John (1969). "Studies devoted to S. W. Koelle's Polyglotta Africana: Etsako". African Languages Review, vol. 8, 1969, pp. 257–262.
 Prost, A.  (1966). "La langue Gurma dans la Polyglotta Africana." Sierra Leone Language Review 5, 1966, pp. 134–138.
 Prost, A. (1969). "Studies devoted to S. W. Koelle's Polyglotta Africana: La langue de Tumbuktu". African Languages Review, vol. 8, 1969, pp. 272–278.
 Pugach, Sara (2006). "Koelle, Sigismund Wilhelm (1823–1902)".
 Rowlands, E. C. (1965). "Yoruba Dialects in the Polyglotta Africana". Sierra Leone Language Review, 4. 1965, pp. 103–108.
 Solleveld, Floris (2020). "Language Gathering and Philological Expertise: Sigismund Koelle, Wilhelm Bleek, and the Languages of Africa". Les Linguistes allemands du XIXème siècle et leurs interlocuteurs étrangers. pp. 169–200.
 Spencer, John (1966). "S. W. Koelle and the Problem of Notation for African Languages, 1847-1855". Sierra Leone Language Review 5, pp. 83–105.
 Stewart, John M. (1966). "Asante Twi in the Polyglotta Africana." Sierra Leone Language Review 5, 1966, pp. 111–115.
 Williamson, Kay (1966). "Ijo Dialects in the Polyglotta Africana." Sierra Leone Language Review 5, 1966, pp. 122–133.
 Winston, F. D. D. (1964). "Nigerian Cross River Languages in the Polyglotta Africana: Part 1". Sierra Leone Language Review, 3, 1964, pp. 74–82. 
 Winston, F. D. D. (1965). "Nigerian Cross River Languages in the Polyglotta Africana: Part 2". Sierra Leone Language Review, 4, 1965, pp. 122–128.
 Zwernemann, Jürgen (1967). "Kasem Dialects in the Polyglotta Africana". African Language Review 6, pp. 128–152.

References

External links
CLDF dataset (digitized wordlists) from Lexibank

1854 books
Books about Africa
Comparative linguistics
History of linguistics
Languages of Africa
Linguistics books